Lepturalia is a genus of beetles belonging to the family Cerambycidae.

The species of this genus are found in Europe and Russia.

Species:
 Lepturalia nigripes (Degeer, 1775)

References

Cerambycidae
Cerambycidae genera